Jo-Anne Knowles (born in Oldham, Lancashire) is an English actress.

Having started acting at the age of 11, she has appeared in many major soaps, including ITV's Emmerdale and Coronation Street, BBC One's EastEnders and Doctors, and Channel 4's Hollyoaks. She is best known for playing Janis Steel in Sky1's Mile High and Fanny Tickler in Channel 4's Phoenix Nights. She has played recurring roles in The Bill, and Waterloo Road, has had many guest roles in Holby City and Casualty and was in two episodes of the BBC mini-series Moving On. She has also played Mina Van Helsing in the popular CBBC series Young Dracula.

She is married and lives in London. She gave birth to a daughter in 2010.

Filmography

References

External links

1969 births
Living people
Actresses from Oldham
English soap opera actresses
English television actresses
Actresses from Lancashire
20th-century English actresses
21st-century English actresses